Guazhou is a town in Hanjiang District, Yangzhou, Jiangsu, China. , it administers two residential neighborhoods: Chenjiawan and Silipu, as well as three villages: Guazhou Village, Juzhuang Village, and Junqiao Village.

References

Township-level divisions of Jiangsu
Hanjiang District, Yangzhou